Angélica Rocío Melchor Vásquez (born 12 April 1980) is a Mexican politician affiliated with the PRD. As of 2013 she served as Deputy of the LXII Legislature of the Mexican Congress representing Oaxaca.

References

1980 births
Living people
People from Oaxaca City
Women members of the Chamber of Deputies (Mexico)
Party of the Democratic Revolution politicians
21st-century Mexican politicians
21st-century Mexican women politicians
Deputies of the LXII Legislature of Mexico
Members of the Chamber of Deputies (Mexico) for Oaxaca